Sir Arthur Kaye, 3rd Baronet (c. 1670–1726), of Woodsome Hall, near Huddersfield,  Yorkshire, was an English Tory politician who sat in the House of Commons from 1710 to 1726.

Kaye was born about 1670, the third but eldest surviving son of Sir John Kaye, 2nd Baronet. He matriculated at Christ Church, Oxford on 2 March 1686, aged 15. He succeeded his father in the baronetcy on 8 August 1706.

Kaye was elected Member of Parliament (MP) for Yorkshire at the 1710 general election and was returned there unopposed in 1713. He was returned unopposed for Yorkshire again at the  1715 and 1722 general elections.

Kaye died on 10 July 1726 leaving one daughter, Elizabeth, who married George Legge, Viscount Lewisham, the heir of the 1st Earl of Dartmouth. Viscount Legge died soon afterwards in 1732, to be succeeded in turn by his eldest son, William Legge, 2nd Earl of Dartmouth.

References

 

1670 births
1726 deaths
Baronets in the Baronetage of England
People from Huddersfield
Members of the Parliament of Great Britain for English constituencies
British MPs 1710–1713
British MPs 1713–1715
British MPs 1715–1722
British MPs 1722–1727